The tunnels of San Antonio are located in the province of Luya, Peru. They are rocky formations like natural bridges placed over San Antonio river.

An archaeological cave painting was documented in 1986 in the place of San Antonio (Luya), by one of the Antisuyo expeditions  organized by the Amazon Archaeology Institute. It is constituted in the first sample of authentic cave painting detected in the Amazonian Andes and, in general, in the Peruvian mountain range.

It is not a question, in effect, of a rock painting but of a painting executed on a wall. Also its lines are very different from the typical ones used by rock art; what can be realized by the high grade of naturalism with which the personages' faces were painted.

The cave painting of San Antonio was not seen by the experts who went along formerly along the place, as Langlois or the archaeologists Reichlen. This is not only because they passed through San Antonio hurriedly, but because all the paintings are only perceptible clearly at certain hours of the day, when the sunlight does not illuminate them directly. In spite of everything, the San Antonio's cave paintings, although they remained completely undiscovered, were already known since older times by the people from this region; the first references were received by Carlos Torres Mas and Carlos Gates.

Even without them, the Antisuyo expedition/86 would have stumbled over the mural, because they had programmed a systematical prospect of San Antonio and an execution of topographic raisings in this important architectural set. The mural was investigated thoroughly: traced, photographed and documented in video, in 1986 and then in 1987 by the same expedition.

San Antonio's cave paintings are affected by time. Nevertheless, it is possible to perceive the main part of the represented scene, as well as also the details of the principal images that integrate it. The scene is painted inside a curved wall. The lines were achieved basically with ochre–red, applied on a rendered layer, white, which covers the stucco of the carefully smoothed yellowish clay.

The painted wall is a part of what, perhaps from its origin was only a wall of ceremonial character in the shape of a semicircle. Judging by the still preserved sector, this wall reached more than 4,80 m high and had more than 9,60 m long. The painting covers  the whole wall horizontally in its lower sector. This way, the personages move across a surface of 9,60 m. They have a regular height: between 1,10 and 1,40 m. The wall is opened opposite the caves of existing sarcofagi in the hill that raises to the other side of the gorge, some of these are still untouched by man due to the difficulty of the access that the ravine presents. It is considered that it is not fortuitous the fact that the wall has been painted opposite the stack in which the sarcofagi were located.

The painting seems to represent a ritual or magic dance staged by five mixed couples. Against this assumption, it might be argued that the personages do not show any movement. They appear to be stood up and in front of each other. But it is symptomatic that the couples are holding hands.

In one of the ends of the described scene, there are, additionally, a conglomerate of figures that are projected upward by more than 2 m. Its precarious state of conservation prevents a global identification of the represented motives. It is only possible to realize, clearly, some of the details. This sector does not present the arranging in which the personages are executed. And although it is less spoilt, it conserve, nevertheless, parts in which color has scarcely suffered the pass of time.

Men differ because their pompous hairstyle, imitating apparently the horn of deer. Some of the women exhibit a type of hairstyle that reminds the one used by some feminine figures presented in Pajatén: composed by two oblique segments that the author has interpreted as symbolic wings. In the generality of the figures, the bodies and faces treatment is simple, with a tendency to the schematic.

Men's face, in a special way the one that corresponds to that of the second couple counting from the left side, shows a high grade of improving speaking of its execution due to the realism and the expressiveness that he exhibits. In this case, the artist presented the personage's face looking lightly to one side, but with the frontal eyes. It's a whole artistic prowess, if it is not the result of purely chance lines. The personage 's visage produces stupor and astonishment in whom they contemplate it, because of the pupils that look fixedly like auscultating the mental intimacies of the spectator.

References

History of Amazonas Region
Geography of Amazonas Region